Nabalamprophyllite has a general formula of . The name is given for its composition (Naba, meaning sodium, Na and barium, Ba) and relation to other lamprophyllite-group minerals. Lamprophyllite is a rare Ti-bearing silicate mineral usually found in intrusive igneous rocks.

Nabalamprophyllite is monoclinic, which means crystallographically, it contains three axes of unequal length and the angles between two of the axes are 90°, and one is less than 90°. It belongs to the  space group P2/m. The mineral also has an orthorhombic polytype (nabalamprophyllite-2O). This mineral belongs to the space group Pnmn. In terms of its optical properties, nabalamprophyllite is anisotropic which means the velocity of light varies depending on direction through the mineral. Its calculated relief is 1.86 - 1.87.  Its color in plane polarized light is green-brown, and it is weakly pleochroic.

The mineral has only been found in Russia, usually in association with coarse-grained igneous rocks called pegmatites. The type localities are the Inagli alkaline–ultrabasic massif, Yakutia and the Kovdor alkaline–ultrabasic massif in the Kola Peninsula.

References

N.V. Chukanov, M.M. Moiseev, I.V. Pekov, K.A. Lazebnik, R.K. Rastsvetaeva, N.V. Zayakina, G. Ferraris, G. Ivaldi (2004) Nabalamprophyllite Ba(Na,Ba){Na3Ti[Ti2O2Si4O14](OH,F)2}, a new layer titanosilicate of the lamprophyllite group from the Inagli and Kovdor alkaline-ultrabasic massifs, Russia. Zapiski Vseross. Mineral. Obshch., 133(1), 59–72 (in Russian, English abstract).

Sorosilicates
Barium minerals
Sodium minerals
Titanium minerals
Monoclinic minerals
Minerals in space group 10